Fra Lippo Lippi can refer to:

Filippo Lippi, a Florentine painter
Fra Lippo Lippi (band), a Norwegian band
Fra Lippo Lippi (poem), written by Robert Browning